Dutsi is a Local Government Area in Katsina State, Nigeria. Its headquarters are in the town of Dutsi in north Nigeria.

It has an area of 283 km and a population of 120,023 at the 2006 census.

The postal code of the area is 823.

References

Local Government Areas in Katsina State